Roy Hardeman Bailey (December 16, 1928 – December 13, 2018) was a Canadian politician.

Formerly a member of the Social Credit Party of Saskatchewan, Bailey joined the Progressive Conservative Party of Saskatchewan when the Social Credit and PC parties merged under the PC name in 1971.

Bailey ran for the leadership of the Saskatchewan PC Party in 1973, placing second to Dick Collver.

He was elected to the Legislative Assembly of Saskatchewan in the 1975 provincial election as the Progressive Conservative Member of the Legislative Assembly for Rosetown-Elrose, and served until 1978.

Bailey was a school board trustee in the Borderland School Division (since consolidated into the Prairie South School Division) from 1984 to 1993.

He was elected to the House of Commons in 1997, representing the riding of Souris—Moose Mountain for the Reform Party of Canada and its successor, the Canadian Alliance, until 2004. He served as the Veterans Affairs critic for the Alliance. He did not seek re-election in the 2004 election.

Bailey was also variously an educational administrator, a farmer, and a teacher. He died on December 13, 2018.

References

External links
 

1928 births
2018 deaths
Members of the House of Commons of Canada from Saskatchewan
Reform Party of Canada MPs
Canadian Alliance MPs
Progressive Conservative Party of Saskatchewan MLAs
People from Radville, Saskatchewan
21st-century Canadian politicians